= Dubai College of Tourism =

Vocational higher institution in Dubai, United Arab Emirates

- كلية دبي للسياحة
- Type: Vocational college
- Established: 2017
- Accreditation: UAE Ministry of Education
- Location: Dubai, United Arab Emirates
- Campus: Urban
- Website: https://dct.ac.ae/en/

Dubai College of Tourism (Arabic: كلية دبي للسياحة; DCT) is a vocational higher institution in Dubai, United Arab Emirates. It was established in 2017 to provide education and training programmes related to tourism, hospitality, culinary arts, and events management.

== History ==
Dubai College of Tourism was established in 2017 by the Dubai Department of Economy and Tourism (formerly the Dubai Department of Tourism and Commerce Marketing). The institution provides vocational education and training programmes related to tourism and hospitality in Dubai.

In March 2019, DCT opened a purpose-built campus at One Central, Dubai World Trade Centre, designed to bring students into close proximity with industry partners and tourism infrastructure.

=== Accreditation and organization ===
Dubai College of Tourism offers programmes accredited by the United Arab Emirates Ministry of Education. The institution collaborates with external organisations in the fields of tourism and hospitality education and training. It administers the Dubai Tour Guide Programme, an online certification initiative for tour guides in Dubai. The college also contributes to workforce development projects, including initiatives connected to Emiratisation within the tourism and hospitality sector.

== Academic programmes ==
Dubai College of Tourism offers vocational education through certificate, diploma, and advanced diploma programmes. Academic offerings are organized across four main disciplines:

- Tourism
- Hospitality
- Culinary Arts
- Events Management

Programmes are designed to combine theoretical instruction with hands-on learning experiences, including internships, volunteering opportunities, and site visits, which are integrated into the curriculum to enhance practical skill development. These programmes are structured in accordance with the UAE National Qualifications Framework (QFEmirates).

=== Campus and facilities ===
The main campus of Dubai College of Tourism is located at One Central, within the Dubai World Trade Centre district. The campus includes teaching and training facilities designed for vocational education, as well as learning spaces intended to support collaboration with industry partners. DCT also operates specialised culinary training facilities to support programmes in professional cookery and culinary arts.

== Pathways and progression ==
The Dubai College of Tourism (DCT) offers academic and professional progression pathways for students in tourism and hospitality-related fields. Students may advance from certificate-level qualifications to diploma and advanced diploma programmes within the institution. The college also provides progression opportunities to international higher education institutions, subject to the admission requirements of partner universities.

Eastern Mediterranean University (EMU): Graduates of DCT’s Advanced Diploma in Culinary Arts can progress to the final year of the BA in Gastronomy and Culinary Arts at EMU in Cyprus, with a 10% tuition fee discount and no English language requirement.

Edinburgh Napier University (ENU): DCT graduates in Tourism and Hotel Management or Event Management can transition directly to Year 3 of select undergraduate programmes at ENU in the UK, earning a BA in International Tourism Management or Hospitality Management. These degrees can be completed on-campus or online.
